Disconnection is the debut album of Strange Parcels, released on August 16, 1994 by On-U Sound Records. Bill Tilland of the music journal Option said gave the album a positive review, saying "There's enough ear candy here to satiate even the sweetest audio sweet tooth, and it's served up with a combination of outrageous musical humor and impeccable taste."

Track listing

Personnel 

Strange Parcels
Keith LeBlanc – drums, programming (10)
Skip McDonald – guitar, vocals, keyboards
Doug Wimbish – bass guitar, effects
Additional musicians
Basil Clarke – vocals
Jesse Rae – vocals
Talvin Singh – percussion
David Harrow – keyboards, programming

Technical personnel
Paul Beckett –  programming, recording
Tackhead – producer

Release history

References

External links 
 

1994 debut albums
On-U Sound Records albums